Epigraphodes is a genus of beetles in the family Carabidae, containing the following species:

 Epigraphodes congoensis (Burgeon, 1935)
 Epigraphodes kivuensis (Basilewsky, 1955)
 Epigraphodes ulguruanus (Basilewsky, 1962)

References

Panagaeinae